The 21st Critics' Choice Awards were presented on January 17, 2016 at the Barker Hangar at the Santa Monica Airport, honoring the finest achievements of filmmaking and television programming in 2015. The ceremony was simulcast on A&E, Lifetime and LMN, and hosted by T.J. Miller. The nominees were announced on December 14, 2015.

This year marked the first time the awards were combined with the Critics' Choice Television Awards into one event onward.

Winners and nominees

Film

{| class=wikitable
|-
| valign="top" width="50%"|

Spotlight
 The Big Short
 Bridge of Spies
 Brooklyn
 Carol
 Mad Max: Fury Road
 The Martian
 The Revenant
 Room
 Sicario
 Star Wars: The Force Awakens
| valign="top" width="50%"|

George Miller – Mad Max: Fury Road
 Todd Haynes – Carol
 Alejandro G. Iñárritu – The Revenant
 Tom McCarthy – Spotlight
 Ridley Scott – The Martian
 Steven Spielberg – Bridge of Spies
|-
| valign="top" width="50%"|

Leonardo DiCaprio – The Revenant as Hugh Glass
 Bryan Cranston – Trumbo as Dalton Trumbo
 Matt Damon – The Martian as Mark Watney
 Johnny Depp – Black Mass as James "Whitey" Bulger
 Michael Fassbender – Steve Jobs as Steve Jobs
 Eddie Redmayne – The Danish Girl as Lili Elbe / Einar Wegener
| valign="top" width="50%"|

Brie Larson – Room as Joy "Ma" Newsome
 Cate Blanchett – Carol as Carol Aird
 Jennifer Lawrence – Joy as Joy Mangano
 Charlotte Rampling – 45 Years as Kate Mercer
 Saoirse Ronan – Brooklyn as Eilis Lacey
 Charlize Theron – Mad Max: Fury Road as Imperator Furiosa
|-
| valign="top" width="50%"|

Sylvester Stallone – Creed as Rocky Balboa
 Paul Dano – Love & Mercy as Brian Wilson
 Tom Hardy – The Revenant as John Fitzgerald
 Mark Ruffalo – Spotlight as Michael Rezendes
 Mark Rylance – Bridge of Spies as Rudolf Abel
 Michael Shannon – 99 Homes as Rick Carver
| valign="top" width="50%"|

Alicia Vikander – The Danish Girl as Gerda Wegener
 Jennifer Jason Leigh – The Hateful Eight as Daisy Domergue
 Rooney Mara – Carol as Therese Belivet
 Rachel McAdams – Spotlight as Sacha Pfeiffer
 Helen Mirren – Trumbo as Hedda Hopper
 Kate Winslet – Steve Jobs as Joanna Hoffman
|-
| valign="top" width="50%"|

Jacob Tremblay – Room as Jack Newsome
 Abraham Attah – Beasts of No Nation as Agu
 RJ Cyler – Me and Earl and the Dying Girl as Earl Jackson
 Shameik Moore – Dope as Malcolm Adekanbi
 Milo Parker – Mr. Holmes as Roger Munro
| valign="top" width="50%"|

Spotlight
 The Big Short
 The Hateful Eight
 Straight Outta Compton
 Trumbo
|-
| valign="top" width="50%"|

Tom McCarthy and Josh Singer – Spotlight
 Matt Charman and Ethan Coen & Joel Coen – Bridge of Spies
 Pete Docter, Meg LeFauve, and Josh Cooley – Inside Out
 Alex Garland – Ex Machina
 Quentin Tarantino – The Hateful Eight
| valign="top" width="50%"|

Adam McKay and Charles Randolph – The Big Short
 Emma Donoghue – Room
 Drew Goddard – The Martian
 Nick Hornby – Brooklyn
 Aaron Sorkin – Steve Jobs
|-
| valign="top" colspan="2" width="50%"|

Inside Out
 Anomalisa
 The Good Dinosaur
 The Peanuts Movie
 Shaun the Sheep Movie
|-
| valign="top" width="50%"|

Amy
 Cartel Land
 Going Clear
 He Named Me Malala
 The Look of Silence
 Where to Invade Next
| valign="top" width="50%"|

Son of Saul (Saul fia) • Hungary The Assassin (Cìkè Niè Yǐnniáng) • China / Hong Kong / Taiwan
 Goodnight Mommy (Ich seh, Ich seh) • Austria
 Mustang • France / Germany / Turkey
 The Second Mother (Que Horas Ela Volta?) • Brazil
|-
| valign="top" colspan="2" width="50%"|Mad Max: Fury Road
 Furious 7
 Jurassic World
 Mission: Impossible – Rogue Nation
 Sicario
|-
| valign="top" width="50%"|

Tom Hardy – Mad Max: Fury Road as Max Rockatansky
 Daniel Craig – Spectre as James Bond
 Tom Cruise – Mission: Impossible – Rogue Nation as Ethan Hunt
 Chris Pratt – Jurassic World as Owen Grady
 Paul Rudd – Ant-Man as Scott Lang / Ant-Man
| valign="top" width="50%"|

Charlize Theron – Mad Max: Fury Road as Imperator Furiosa
 Emily Blunt – Sicario as Kate Macer
 Rebecca Ferguson – Mission: Impossible – Rogue Nation as Ilsa Faust
 Bryce Dallas Howard – Jurassic World as Claire Dearing
 Jennifer Lawrence – The Hunger Games: Mockingjay – Part 2 as Katniss Everdeen
|-
| valign="top" colspan="2" width="50%"|

The Big Short
 Inside Out
 Joy
 Sisters
 Spy
 Trainwreck
|-
| valign="top" width="50%"|

Christian Bale – The Big Short as Michael Burry
 Steve Carell – The Big Short as Mark Baum
 Robert De Niro – The Intern as Ben Whittaker
 Bill Hader – Trainwreck as Dr. Aaron Conners
 Jason Statham – Spy as Rick Ford
| valign="top" width="50%"|

Amy Schumer – Trainwreck as Amy Townsend
 Tina Fey – Sisters as Kate Ellis
 Jennifer Lawrence – Joy as Joy Mangano
 Melissa McCarthy – Spy as Susan Cooper
 Lily Tomlin – Grandma as Elle Reid
|-
| valign="top" colspan="2" width="50%"|

Ex Machina
 It Follows
 Jurassic World
 Mad Max: Fury Road
 The Martian
|-
| valign="top" width="50%"|

Colin Gibson (Production Designer), Lisa Thompson (Set Decorator) – Mad Max: Fury Road
 Judy Becker (Production Designer), Heather Loeffler (Set Decorator) – Carol
 Arthur Max (Production Designer), Celia Bobak (Set Decorator) – The Martian
 François Séguin (Production Designer), Jenny Oman and Louise Tremblay (Set Decorators) – Brooklyn
 Eve Stewart (Production Designer), Michael Standish (Set Decorator) – The Danish Girl
 Adam Stockhausen (Production Designer), Rena DeAngelo (Set Decorator) – Bridge of Spies
| valign="top" width="50%"|

Emmanuel Lubezki – The Revenant Roger Deakins – Sicario
 Edward Lachman – Carol
 Robert Richardson – The Hateful Eight
 John Seale – Mad Max: Fury Road
 Dariusz Wolski – The Martian
|-
| valign="top" width="50%"|Jenny Beavan – Mad Max: Fury Road Paco Delgado – The Danish Girl Odile Dicks-Mireaux – Brooklyn Sandy Powell – Carol Sandy Powell – Cinderella| valign="top" width="50%"|

Margaret Sixel – Mad Max: Fury Road
 Hank Corwin – The Big Short Tom McArdle – Spotlight Stephen Mirrione – The Revenant Pietro Scalia – The Martian|-
| valign="top" width="50%"|

Ennio Morricone – The Hateful Eight
 Carter Burwell – Carol Jóhann Jóhannsson – Sicario Ryuichi Sakamoto and Alva Noto – The Revenant Howard Shore – Spotlight| valign="top" width="50%"|

"See You Again" – Furious 7
 "Love Me like You Do" – Fifty Shades of Grey "One Kind of Love" – Love & Mercy "Simple Song #3" – Youth "Til It Happens to You" – The Hunting Ground "Writing's on the Wall" – Spectre|-
| valign="top" width="50%"|Mad Max: Fury Road Black Mass Carol The Danish Girl The Hateful Eight The Revenant| valign="top" width="50%"|Mad Max: Fury Road Ex Machina Jurassic World The Martian The Revenant The Walk|}

Television

Louis XIII Genius Award
Industrial Light & Magic

Critics' Choice MVP Award
Amy Schumer

Star Wars: The Force Awakens addition
The film Star Wars: The Force Awakens screened too late for the vast majority of the Broadcast Film Critics Association to see it in time for consideration for the awards. But after what an email to members called "an unprecedented cry out" from its membership, the BFCA's board of directors called a "special referendum" on adding the movie to the ten candidates for Best Picture, which it won. (A similar situation happened for the 6th Critics' Choice Awards in 2001, in which the film Cast Away was voted by referendum to be included among the nominees for Best Picture.) The BFCA faced immediate criticism, including from its own members, over what many saw as an attempt to increase ratings for the awards ceremony's broadcast on A&E (which, is 50% owned by Disney, the company behind Star Wars) on January 17, 2016. Two members—Eric Melin (editor-in-chief of Scene-Stealers.com, a film critic of Lawrence Journal-World, and the president of the Kansas City Film Critics Circle) and Scott Renshaw (editor of Salt Lake City Weekly'')—resigned in protest.

Melin, in an open letter, wrote: 

Similarly, in another open letter, Scott Renshaw wrote:

Films with multiple nominations and wins
The following twenty-six films received multiple nominations:

The following five films received multiple awards:

Television programs with multiple nominations and wins
The following programs received multiple nominations:

The following programs received multiple awards:

References

External links
 21st Annual Critics' Choice Awards – Winners

Broadcast Film Critics Association Awards
2015 film awards
2016 in California
January 2016 events in the United States